Aldersyde is a small town in the Wheatbelt region of Western Australia, about  east of the town of Brookton.

History
Land for a proposed townsite at the 18½-mile peg on the Brookton-Kunjin Railway (Kunjin being near Corrigin) was reclaimed from four properties in 1913. One of the properties, owned by Frederick Pyke, was named "Aldersyde", and this name was suggested as the name of the town by the local progress association in 1914. "Nuralgin" and "Markegin" were other names considered; Aldersyde was gazetted in 1915.

The surrounding areas produce wheat and other cereal crops. The town is a receival site for Cooperative Bulk Handling.

References

Towns in Western Australia
Wheatbelt (Western Australia)
Grain receival points of Western Australia